The status of women in Iraq at the beginning of the 21st century is affected by many factors: wars (most recently the Iraq War), sectarian religious debates concerning Islamic law and Iraq's Constitution, cultural traditions, and modern secularism. Hundreds of thousands of Iraqi women are widowed as a result of a series of wars and internal conflicts. Women's rights organizations struggle against harassment and intimidation, while they work to promote improvements to women's status in the law, in education, the workplace, and many other spheres of Iraqi life, and to curtail abusive traditional practices such as honor killings and forced marriages.

Historical background 

During the seventh century  the lamas as a part of their conquest were fighting the Persians, who were defeated. Doreen Ingrams, the author of The Awakened: Women in Iraq, stated it was a time when women's help was needed. In particular, a woman called Amina bint Qais "at the age of seventeen was the youngest woman to lead a medical team in one of these early battles." After their victory, the Arabs that began ruling Mesopotamia named that country Iraq. During the Abbasid Caliphate, it was common for upper-class men to own women as sex slaves, with the Abbasid harem as role model, and a number of enslaved women (qiyan) were known for their wit and charm: “many of the well-known women of the time were slave girls who had been trained from childhood in music, dancing and poetry". A story featured in One Thousand and One Nights involves Tawaddud, “a slave girl who was said to have been bought at great cost by Harun al-Rashid because she had passed her examinations by the most eminent scholars in astronomy, medicine, law, philosophy, music, history, Arabic grammar, literature, theology and chess”. It was rarer for free women to achieve prominence in Abbasid society, though some notable women did exist. Among the most prominent female figures was a scholar named Shuhda, who was known as “the Pride of Women” during the twelfth century in Baghdad.

In 1258, Baghdad was attacked and captured by the Mongols. With the departure of the Mongols a succession of Persian rivalries followed until 1553, when the Ottoman Sultan Suleiman captured Baghdad and its provinces, which became parts of the Turkish empire. Ingrams states that Turks “had inflexible rules concerning women", leading to a decline in the status of women. In contrast, Beatrice Forbes Manz states that women were granted a relatively high and public position in Turkic and Mongol societies, and several women in the Turkic dynasties ruling Iraq, like the Timurid Empire, achieved political importance.

Following the collapse of the Ottoman Empire in the aftermath of World War I, Britain was given the Mandate for administering Iraq by the League of Nations and therefore a new era began in Iraq under British rule. In the 1920s there was a "major uprising where women took part" (p. 27). The Iraqi women's movement started with the foundation of the Women's Awakening Club, and the first women's magazine, Layla, was first published in 1923, by journalist Paulina Hassoun. 

In 1932, Iraq was declared independent and in 1958 was declared a Republic as a member of the League of Nations. As Doreen Ingrams argues, instability was dominating the region until 1968 when "the Ba’ath Party took control over the President Al Bakr and Iraq began to enjoy a period of stability" (p. 28).  Majda al-Haidari, wife of Raouf al-Chadirchi, has sometimes been said to be the first woman in Baghdad to have appeared unveiled in the 1930s, but the Communist Amina al-Rahal, sister of Husain al-Rahal, have also been named as the first unveiled role model in Baghdad. In the 1930s and 1940s, female College students gradually started to appear unveiled, and most upper- and middle class urban women in Iraq were said to be unveiled by 1963.

In Ba'athist Iraq (1968-2003), the Secular Socialist Baath Party women were officially stated to be equal to men, and urban women were normally unveiled.  In 1970, equal rights for women were enshrined in Iraq's Constitution, including the right to vote, run for political office, access education and own property. Saddam Hussein succeeded Al Bakr as President in 1979. After the fall of Saddam Hussein in 2003, there was a surge in threats and harassment of unveiled women, and the use of hijab became common in Iraq.

Education 

Iraq established an education system in 1921 and by the 1970s education became public and free at all levels. Despite education being free until 1970, women had lower literacy rates than men on average. Girls possessed low literacy rates because there were not enough schools to instruct them even though the Iraqi government made education mandatory for everyone. Furthermore, women were required to have completed a basic education to vote in 1957. A census conducted during this time showed that approximately one percent of women could legally vote. This highlights a large disparity in not only women who are educated, but those who are able to vote. During the 1970s and 1980s, despite Saddam Hussein attempting to use higher education as a form of propaganda, the overall illiteracy rate dropped until the Iran-Iraq War. The progression of women's education has been hampered by the Iran-Iraq War, Gulf War, and the 2003 Iraq War. Throughout these wars, there have been several authoritarian leaders whose government policies negatively affected those in higher education. One those changes in regards to government policy is the severe lack of government funding to those in universities following the costly Iran-Iraq War. Government spending dropped from $620 before the Iran-Iraq War to $47; This decline happened slowly over time as Iraq as a country was suffering from economic challenges and put its budget elsewhere.  Consequently, this caused the enrollment rate to drop by 10% and the dropout rate by 20%, of which 31% were females compared to that of 18% of males; There were less women with upper-level jobs since they could not afford them in the first place. Women's overall literacy rate continued to decline well after the Iran-Iraq War, moreover this decline was more pronounced in the Southern rural provinces where obtaining an education was already difficult to begin with.  Overall attendance during the Iraq War was 68% amongst young girls compared to 82% of young boys, while girls in rural areas had a mere 25% attendance rate. The wars forced women to work in agriculture rather than pursue a degree as necessary items such as food and water started to become more scarce and expensive. Violence against women, such as rape, became more commonplace during the war period and was another reason as to why women did not pursue education. Wartime violence was less pronounced in the Northern provinces of Iraq since less conflicts occurred in the region, which was under influence by Kurdish leaders.  During the Gulf War, the economic situation became so dire that women could not afford transportation fares to go to school in the first place. Furthermore, some of the universities that did operate required women to wear the hijab; Those who didn't were subject to discrimination or sexual harassment by their male peers. These students had to end their education abruptly and take care of their children instead. Outside of wartime violence, there was a common perception that a hand in marriage provided better economic security than attending school. The reliance on early marriages and the stress and grief caused by the wars on women left them incapable of making positive changes in the country via a political position. Furthermore, the many years of education that women lost because of the wars created more wage and gender inequality for many years to come.

The gender gap with regard to Iraq's literacy rate is narrowing. Overall, 26% of Iraqi women are illiterate, and 11% of Iraqi men. For youth aged 15–24 years, the literacy rate is 80% for young women, and 85% for young men. Girls are less likely than boys to continue their education beyond the primary level, and their enrollment numbers drop sharply after that. Education levels attained by Iraqi women and men in 2007 were:

Women's rights 
With an estimated population of 22,675,617, Iraq is a male dominated society.  Although there are many classes and castes within the culture, the official languages of Iraq are Arabic and Kurdish.

On International Women's Day, 8 March 2011, a coalition of 17 Iraqi women's rights groups formed the National Network to Combat Violence Against Women in Iraq.

The Organization of Women's Freedom in Iraq (OWFI) is another Non-governmental organization committed to the defense of women's rights in Iraq. It has been very active in Iraq for several years, with thousands of members, and it is the Iraqi women's rights organization with the largest international profile. It was founded in June 2003 by Yanar Mohammed, Nasik Ahmad and Nadia Mahmood. It defends full social equality between women and men and secularism, and fights against Islamic fundamentalism and the American occupation of Iraq. Its president is Yanar Mohammed.

OWFI originated with the Organisation indépendante des femmes, active in Kurdistan from 1992 to 2003 despite government and religious oppression, and the Coalition de défense des droits des femmes irakiennes, founded in 1998 by Iraqi women in exile. OWFI concentrates its activities on the fight against sharia law, against abduction and murder of women and against honour killings. Thousands of members strong, it has at its disposal a network of support from outside Iraq, notably from the United States. It also has members in Great Britain, Canada, Sweden, Switzerland, the Netherlands, Norway, Finland, and Denmark. Its activists and its directors have many times been the object of death threats from Islamic organizations.

The circumstances resulting from the Gulf War and then the Kurdish uprising in Iraq in 1991, gave the Kurdish region of Iraq an essentially autonomous situation for a period, despite the conflicts between zones controlled by the largest nationalist parties. This allowed the development of some claims to women's rights, which in turn influenced some of the women who would become active in founding OWFI.

The founding statement of OWFI contains a mandate in six points:
 To put in place a humanist law founded on equality and the assurance of the greatest freedom for women, and to abolish all forms of discriminatory laws;
 To separate religion from the government and education;
 To put an end to all forms of violence against women and honour killings, and to push for punishment for the murderers of women;
 To abolish mandatory wearing of veils, the veil for children and to protect freedom of dress;
 To put in place the equal participation of women and men in all social, economic, administrative and political spheres, at every level;
 To abolish gender segregation in schools at all levels.

Some militant women's rights advocates in Iraq, who seek to establish a dialogue with Islamist women, maintain a distance from the radical feminism and secularism of OWFI.

Women's rights in Iraqi Kurdistan 
Some reported issues related to women in Kurdish society include genital mutilation,  honor killings, domestic violence, female infanticide  and polygamy. Majority of reports have come from Iraq where the Kurdish and Iraqi population have been poorly educated and illiteracy is still a big problem among citizens. However, some reported issues have not been taken seriously, because all reported issues are common among the populations with whom they live.

Some Kurds in small populated areas, especially uneducated Kurds are organized in patrilineal clans, there is patriarchal control of marriage and property, women are generally treated in many ways like property. Rural Kurdish women are often not allowed to make their own decisions regarding sexuality or husbands, arranged marriages and in some places child marriages are common. Some Kurdish men, especially religious Kurds also practice polygamy. However, polygamy has almost disappeared from Kurdish culture, especially in Syria after Rojava made it illegal. Some Kurdish women from uneducated, religious and poor families who took their own decisions with marriage or had affairs have become victims of violence, including beatings, honor killings and in extreme cases pouring acid on faces (very rare) (Kurdish Women's Rights Watch 2007). Kurds generally see having large families as the ideal.

Women's rights activists have said that after the elections in 1992, only five of the 105 elected members of parliament were women, and that women's initiatives were even actively opposed by Kurdish male politicians. Women's rights activist Tanya Gilly Khailany, who was a member of the Iraqi Parliament between 2006 – 2010, pushed for the legislation of 25 per cent quota for women in Iraqi provincial councils.

Honor killings and other forms of violence against women have increased since the creation of Iraqi Kurdistan, and "both the KDP and PUK claimed that women's oppression, including ‘honor killings’, are part of Kurdish ‘tribal and Islamic culture’". New laws against honor killing and polygamy were introduced in Iraqi Kurdistan, however it was noted by Amnesty International that the prosecution of honor killings remains low, and the implementation of the anti-polygamy resolution (in the PUK-controlled areas) has not been consistent. On the other hand,  women rights activists also had some successes in Iraqi Kurdistan, and it was claimed that "the rise of conservative nationalist forces and the women's movement are two sides of the same coin of Kurdish nationalism."

Scholars like Mojab (1996) and Amir Hassanpour (2001) have argued that the patriarchal system in Kurdish regions has been as strong as in other Middle Eastern regions. In 1996, Mojab claimed that the Iraqi Kurdish nationalist movement "discourages any manifestation of womanhood or political demands for gender equality."

In 2001, Persian researcher Amir Hassanpour claimed that "linguistic, discursive, and symbolic violence against women is ubiquitous" in the Kurdish language, matched by various forms of physical and emotional violence.

In 2005, Marjorie P. Lasky from CODEPINK claimed that since the PUK and KDP parties took power in Northern Iraq 1991, "hundreds of women were murdered in honor killings for not wearing hijab and girls could not attend school", and both parties have “continued attempts to suppress the women's organizations”. Marjorie P. Lasky also said that U.S. military personnel have committed crimes of sexual abuse and physical assault against women and they are one of the reasons why women rights have worsened in Iraq. The honor killing and self-immolation condoned or tolerated by the Kurdish administration in Iraqi Kurdistan has been labeled as "gendercide" by Mojab (2003). Lasky concluded: "More widely reported are the Iraqi Kurdish nationalist parties’ "disregard of women's issues and their attempts to suppress women's organizations".

Marriage 

By law, a woman has to be eighteen years or older to get married.  Marriage and family are necessities for economic needs, social control and mutual protection within the family.

Divorce is a very common practice in Iraq.

Legal system 
The Iraqi Constitution of 2005 states that Islam is the main source of legislation and laws must not
contradict Islamic provisions. The family law is discriminatory towards women, particularly with regard to divorce, child custody, and inheritance. In a court of law, a woman's testimony is  worth in some cases half of that of a man, and in some cases it is equal.

In March 2008 an Iraqi 17-year-old girl was violently murdered by her father and two older brothers for becoming friendly with a British soldier.  When her mother ran away out of defiance of such a cruel act, she was found dead on her street, shot in the head twice.  The father was released after two hours of questioning from the Iraqi police force and was neither charged nor tried with the murder of his own daughter, although he had confessed to killing her.

Sharia law 

Islam is the official religion of Iraq with about 97% of the population practice this religion.
On January 29, 2004, the interim Iraqi government, supported by the Islamic Supreme Council of Iraq and despite the strong opposition of the American Administrator Paul Bremer, launched Resolution 137 which introduced sharia law in the "law on personal civil status", which since 1958 established rights and freedoms for Iraqi women. This resolution permitted very different interpretations from the law of 1958 on the part of religious communities. It opened an additional breach in the civil law and risked exacerbating inter-religious tensions in Iraq. In a statement, OWFI affirmed : 

Despite its reputation for being relatively secular, sharia law was never totally absent from Iraq before 2003. The "law on personal civil status" provided that, in the case that it was not expressly forbidden in the law, it would be sharia law that would prevail. A coalition of 85 women's organizations, through means of international communication, launched a protest movement. One month later, on January 29, 2004, the resolution was withdrawn.

Beginning in September 2004, OWFI launched a new campaign against the forced wearing of the veil being enforced by Islamic militias, notably in the universities.

In 2005, there was once again debate over the new constitution, which considered Islam as one of the sources of Iraqi law.  writes Yanar Mohammed For the same reasons, OWFI denounced the 2005 elections, dominates by parties hostile to women's rights.

Women's groups also denounce "pleasure marriages", based on a practise commonly believed to be founded on Islamic law, which was revived during the occupation of Iraq: it authorizes a man to marry a woman, through a money gift, for a determined period of time. In most cases, groups such as OWFI charge, it provides a legal cover for prostitution.

Crimes against women

Female genital mutilation 

Female genital mutilation was an accepted part of Sorani speaking Kurdish culture in Iraq, including Erbil and Sulaymaniyah. A 2011 Kurdish law criminalized FGM practice in Iraqi Kurdistan and law was accepted four years later. MICS reported in 2011 that in Iraq, FGM was found mostly among the Kurdish areas in Erbil, Sulaymaniyah and Kirkuk, giving the country a national prevalence of eight percent. However, other Kurdish areas like Dohuk and some parts of Ninewa were almost free from FGM.

In 2014, a small survey of 827 households conducted in Erbil and Sulaymaniyah assessed a 58.5% prevalence of FGM in both cities. According to the same survey, FGM has declined in recent years. In 2016, the studies showed that there is a trend of general decline of FGM among those who practiced it before. Kurdish human rights organizations have reported several times that FGM is not a part of Kurdish culture and authorities aren't doing enough to stop it completely.

According to a 2008 report in The Washington Post, the Kurdistan region of Iraq is one of the few places in the world where female genital mutilation had been rampant. According to one study carried out in 2008, approximately 60% of all women in Kurdish areas of northern Iraq had been mutilated. It was claimed that at least one Kurdish territory, female genital mutilation had occurred among 95% of women. The Kurdistan Region has strengthened its laws regarding violence against women in general and female genital mutilation in particular, and is now considered to be an anti-FGM model for other countries to follow.

Female genital mutilation was prevalent in Iraqi Kurdistan. In 2010, WADI published a study that 72% of all Kurdish women and girl were circumcised that year. Two years later, a similar study was conducted in the province of Kirkuk with findings of 38% FGM prevalence giving evidence to the assumption that FGM was not only practiced by the Kurdish population but also existed in central Iraq. According to the research, FGM is most common among Sunni Muslims, but is also practiced by Schi’ites and Kakeys, while Christians and Yezidi don't seem to practice it in northern Iraq. In Erbil Governorate and Suleymaniya Type I FGM was common; while in Garmyan and New Kirkuk, Type II and III FGM were common. There was no law against FGM in Iraq, but in 2007 a draft legislation condemning the practice was submitted to the Regional Parliament, but was not passed. A field report by Iraqi group PANA Center, published in 2012, shows 38% of women in Kirkuk and its surrounding districts areas had undergone female circumcision. Of those circumcised, 65% were Kurds, 26% Arabs and rest Turkmen. On the level of religious and sectarian affiliation, 41% were Sunnis, 23% Shiites, rest Kaka’is, and none Christians or Chaldeans. A 2013 report finds FGM prevalence rate of 59% based on clinical examination of about 2000 Iraqi Kurdish women; FGM found were Type I, and 60% of the mutilation were performed to girls in 4–7 year age group.

Female genital mutilation is prevalent in Iraqi Kurdistan, with an FGM rate of 72% according to the 2010 WADI report for the entire region and exceeding 80% in Garmyan and New Kirkuk. In Erbil Governorate and Suleymaniya Type I FGM is common; while in Garmyan and New Kirkuk, Type II and III FGM are common. There was no law against FGM in Iraqi Kurdistan, but in 2007 a draft legislation condemning the practice was submitted to the Regional Parliament,  but was not passed. A 2011 Kurdish law criminalized FGM practice in Iraqi Kurdistan, however this law is not being enforced. A field report by Iraqi group PANA Center, published in 2012, shows 38% of women in Kirkuk and its surrounding districts areas had undergone female circumcision. Of those circumcised, 65% were Kurds, 26% Arabs and rest Turkmen. On the level of religious and sectarian affiliation, 41% were Sunnis, 23% Shiites, rest Kaka’is, and none Christians or Chaldeans. A 2013 report finds FGM prevalence rate of 59% based on clinical examination of about 2000 Iraqi Kurdish women; FGM found were Type I, and 60% of the mutilation were performed to girls in 4–7 year age group.

Honour crimes 
In 2008 the United Nations Assistance Mission for Iraq (UNAMI) has stated that honor killings are a serious concern in Iraq, particularly in Iraqi Kurdistan. The Free Women's Organization of Kurdistan (FWOK) released a statement on International Women's Day 2015 noting that "6,082 women were killed or forced to commit suicide during the past year in Iraqi Kurdistan, which is almost equal to the number of the Peshmerga martyred fighting Islamic State (IS)," and that a large number of women were victims of honor killings or enforced suicide – mostly self-immolation or hanging.

About 500 honour killings per year are reported in hospitals in Iraqi Kurdistan, although real numbers are likely much higher. It is speculated that alone in Erbil there is one honour killing per day. The UNAMI reported that at least 534 honour killings occurred between January and April 2006 in the Kurdish Governorates. It is claimed that many deaths are reported as "female suicides" in order to conceal honour-related crimes. Aso Kamal of the Doaa Network Against Violence claimed that they have estimated that there were more than 12,000 honor killings in Iraqi Kurdistan from 1991 to 2007. He also said that the government figures are much lower, and show a decline in recent years, and Kurdish law has mandated since 2008 that an honor killing be treated like any other murder.

Attitudes towards domestic violence are ambivalent even among women. A UNICEF survey of adolescent girls aged 15–19, covering the years 2002–2009, asked them if they think that a husband is justified in hitting or beating his wife under certain circumstances; 57% responded yes.

Under the Criminal Code of Iraq, honor killings can only be punished with a maximum of three years. According to paragraph 409 "Any person who surprises his wife in the act of adultery or finds his girlfriend in bed with her lover and kills them immediately or one of them or assaults one of them so that he or she dies or is left permanently disabled is punishable by a period of detention not exceeding 3 years. It is not permissible to exercise the right of legal defence against any person who uses this excuse nor do the rules of aggravating circumstance apply against him". In addition to this, a husband also has a legal right to "punish" his wife: paragraph 41 states that there is no crime if an act is committed while exercising a legal right. Examples of legal rights include: "The punishment of a wife by her husband, the disciplining by parents and teachers of children under their authority within certain limits prescribed by law or by custom".

Information supplied by OWFI on the resurgence of honour crimes since 2003 was included in the September 2006 report by the UN Assistance Mission for Iraq (UNAMI).

Shelters 
OWFI created shelters in Baghdad, Kirkuk, Erbil and Nassiriya for women and couples whose families have threatened them with honour crimes. The location of shelters was kept secret and they were under permanent guard. A crisis phone line number was available in each issue of al-Moussawat. An "underground railroad" was put in place, with the help of the American association Madre, to allow some women to clandestinely escape the country. Several other organizations from abroad assisted this initiative.

Since the end of 2007, the shelters, determined to be too dangerous for the residents, were closed and many of the women were accommodated in host families. The operation costs OWFI around $60,000 per year.

Forced prostitution, abductions and killings of women 
Beginning in August 2003, OWFI organized a protest to attract attention to the rapid growth in rapes and abductions. A letter sent by OWFI to Paul Bremer, in charge of the American administration in Iraq, on the question of violence against women, remained unanswered.

An inquiry was initiated by OWFI to examine abductions and killings of women. Yanar Mohammed comes to the following conclusion :  For OWFI, these deaths are linked to honour crimes, but in this case, in a new form, since the killings are taken beyond the family circle to become the business of paramilitary groups.

Beginning in 2006, OWFI initiated an inquiry into the link between widespread abductions of women and prostitution networks. Activists for women's rights in Iraq have mapped and studied prostitution in their country to understand how it functions and how trafficking spreads, showing that the majority of prostitutes are minors and that the trafficking networks extend throughout the Middle East. This campaign of enquiry, publicized by an interview on the channel MBC in May 2009, was denounced by the pro-government channel Al-Iraqia, which held that it constituted a "humiliation for Iraqi women". Indeed, shortly before his resignation, Minister of Women's Affairs Nawal al-Samarraie had declared that the traffic in prostitution was limited and that the young women were involved voluntarily, which Yanar Mohammed had denounced.

The Iraqi Kurdistan region has reportedly received "women and children trafficked from the rest of Iraq for prostitution". Criminal gangs have prostituted girls from outside of the Iraqi Kurdistan Region in the provinces of Erbil, Dahuk, and Sulaymaniyah. NGOs have alleged that some personnel from the Kurdistan Regional Government's Asayish internal security forces have facilitated prostitution in Syrian refugee camps in Iraqi Kurdistan. Iraqi women were sold into “temporary marriages” and Syrian girls from refugee camps in Iraqi Kurdistan were forced into early or “temporary marriages”, and it was alleged that KRG authorities ignored such cases.

On October 2, 2020, a UN special rapporteur urged the Iraqi authorities to investigate the murder of a woman human rights defender, and the attempted killing of another, targeted “simply because they are women”.

Abuse of women since the invasion 
Many people feel it is due to the ongoing terror wrought in this land that brings so much oppression to women.  Prior to the arrival of forces in Iraq in 1991, Iraqi women were free to wear whatever they liked and go wherever they chose. The Iraqi constitution of 1970 gave women equality and liberty in the Muslim world, but since the invasion, women's rights have fallen to the lowest in Iraqi history.

Since the invasion in 2003 "Iraqi women have been brutally attacked, kidnapped and intimidated from participating in the Iraqi society".  Yanar Mohammed, an Iraqi feminist, "asserts unequivocally that war and occupation have cost Iraqi women their legal standing and their everyday freedom of dress and movement". She continues by arguing that "The first losers in all these were women".

Arising from their fear of being raped and harassed, women have to wear not only the veil, but must also to wear chador in order not to attract attention. In an online edition of Guardian, the reporter Mark Lattiner reports that despite promises and hopes given to the Iraqi population that their lives were going to change, Iraqi women's lives "have become immeasurably worse, with rapes, burnings and murders [now] as a daily occurrence."

Women's prisons 
OWFI has set up an observation group of activists, directed by Dalal Jumaa, which focuses its action on the defense of the rights of women in prison and in police detention. It has notably obtained authorization to regularly visit the Khadidimya prison, in Baghdad, and to denounce the detention conditions: rapes during interrogations, poor treatment, and the presence of children in the cells. OWFI has taken part in negotiations with the municipality of Bagdad to open a daycare in proximity to the prison.

In 2009, OWFI was alerted to the situation of 11 women condemned to death, detained in this prison, after the execution of one among them. In 2010, OWFI observers met young girls aged 12 years, expelled from Saudi Arabia for prostitution and imprisoned in Iraq. In February 2014 Human Rights Watch released a 105-page report 'No One is Safe' alleging there are thousands of Iraqi women in jails being held without charge, that are being routinely tortured, beaten, and raped.

Women's workplace rights 

In February 2004, OWFI launched a campaign to support fifty female bank employees held on charges of embezzling millions during exchange operations involving banknotes. Embarrassed by the affair, U.S. authorities freed them and their informant was arrested.

OWFI has denounced the Islamist-influenced licensing process for women in professions. Nuha Salim declared :

Women's social life 
In a speech on April 17, 1971, vice-president Saddam Hussein proclaimed that:
Women make up one half of society. Our society will remain backward and in chains unless its women are liberated, enlightened and educated.Until the 1990s, Iraqi women played an active role in the political and economic development of Iraq. In 1969, the Ba'ath Party established the General Federation of Iraqi Women, which offered many social programs to women, implementing legal reforms advancing women's status under the law and lobbying for changes to the personal status code. In 1986, Iraq became one of the first countries to ratify the Convention on the Elimination of All Forms of Discrimination Against Women.

During the 1970s and 1980s, Saddam Hussein urged women to fill men's places in schools, universities, hospitals, factories, the army, and the police. However, women's employment subsequently decreased as they were encouraged to make way for returning soldiers in the late 1980s and the 1990s. In general in cases of war, as Nadje Sadig Al-Ali, author of Iraqi Women: Untold Stories from 1948 to the Present, argues, "women carried the conflicting double burden of being the main motors of the state bureaucracy and the public sector, the main breadwinners and heads of households but also the mothers of 'future soldiers.' In the years following the 1991 Gulf War, many of the positive steps that had been taken to advance women's and girls’ status in Iraqi society were reversed due to a combination of legal, economic, and political factors. As the economy constricted due to sanctions, women were pushed into more traditional roles. Moreover, Saddam Hussein, in an attempt to maintain legitimacy with conservative Islamic fundamentalists, brought in anti-woman legislation, such as the 1990 presidential decree granting immunity to men who had committed honour crimes. However, despite Saddam's appeals to the anti-women elements of Iraqi society, according to local NGOs, they concluded that "women were treated better during the Saddam Hussein era and their rights were more respected than they are now."

As noted by Yasmin Husein, author of Women in Iraq, the traditional role of women in Iraq is confined mainly to domestic responsibilities and nurturing the family.  The wide scale destruction of Iraq's infrastructure (i.e., sanitation, water supply and electricity) as a result of war and sanctions, worsened women's situation. Women, in the process, assumed extra burdens and domestic responsibilities in society, as opposed to their male counterparts.

Women in the government and military 

The Iraqi Constitution states that a quarter of the government must be made up of women.

In the 1950s it became the first Arab country to have a female minister and to have a law that gave women the ability to ask for divorces.  Women attained the right to vote and run for public office in 1980.  Under Saddam Hussein, women in government got a year's maternity leave.

There is also a large divide among the women themselves, some more modern women wanting a larger percent of women in the Iraqi government still, and some more traditional women believing that they and others are not qualified enough to hold any sort of position in the Iraqi government. Another existing issue is the increasing number of illiterate women in the country. In 1987 approximately 75 percent of Iraqi women were literate. In 2000, Iraq had the lowest regional adult literacy levels, with the percentage of literate women at less than 25 percent. This makes it increasingly difficult to put educated women in a position of power.

Although there are many issues with the current spread of power among genders in Iraq, they are one of the more westernized Arab countries. However, there is hope for women in Iraq. After Hussein's fall in 2003, women's leaders in Iraq saw it as a key opportunity to gain more power in Parliament. The leaders asked for a quota that would have seen that at least 40 percent of the Parliament to be women. In the 2010 National Elections, a group of twelve women started their own party based on women's issues, such as a jobs program for Iraq's 700,000 widows. The United States' involvement in Iraq was seen as detrimental to women. Since Prime Minister Nouri al-Maliki was elected as Prime Minister of Iraq, not one woman has been appointed to his senior cabinet.

Many women across the country, especially young women, are afraid to voice their political voices for fear of harming their reputations. When they do become active politically, they are seen as being influenced by the United States and trying to push a liberal agenda.

Constitutionally, women lost a number of key rights after the United States entered Iraq. The Family Statutes law, which guarantees women equal rights when it comes to marriage, divorce, inheritance, and custody, was replaced by one that gave power to religious leaders and allowed them to dictate family matters according to their interpretation of their chosen religious text.

See also 

 Killing of Tiba al-Ali

References

Bibliography 
 Nicolas Dessaux, Résistances irakiennes : contre l'occupation, l'islamisme et le capitalisme, Paris, L'Échappée, coll. Dans la mêlée, 2006. Critiques par le Monde Diplomatique, Dissidences, Ni patrie, ni frontières. Publié en Turc sous le titre Irak'ta Sol Muhalefet İşgale, İslamcılığa ve Kapitalizme Karşı Direnişle, Versus Kitap / Praxis Kitaplığı Dizisi, 2007.  [Interviews de personnalités de la résistance civile irakienne, don't Surma Hamid, Houzan Mahmoud et Nadia Mahmood, avec notes et introduction permettant de les contextualiser]
 Yifat Susskind, Promising Democracy, Imposing Theocracy: Gender-Based Violence and the US War on Iraq, Madre, 2007 (lire en ligne, lire en format .pdf) [Bilan de la situation des femmes en Irak depuis 2003]
 Houzan Mahmoud, Genre et développement. Les acteurs et actrices des droits des femmes et de la solidarité internationale se rencontrent et échangent sur leurs pratiques. Actes du colloque 30 et 31 mars, Lille , Paris, L'Harmattan, 2008, p. 67-76.
 Osamu Kimura, Iraqi Civil Resistance, Video series « Creating the  Century » n° 8, VHS/DVD, Mabui-Cine Coop Co. Ltd, 2005 [DVD produced in Japan profiling several civil rights activist organizations in Iraq, one of which is OWFI.]
 Osamu Kimura, Go forward, Iraq Freedom Congress. Iraq Civil Resistance Part II, Video series « Creating the  Century » n° 9, VHS/DVD, Mabui-Cine Coop Co. Ltd, 2005 [durée : 32 mn] (DVD documentary produced in Japan focussed on civil resistance in Iraq, notably includes an interview with Yanar Mohammed.)
 Al-Ali, Nadje, and Nicola Pratt. What Kind of Liberation: Women and the Occupation of Iraq. Los Angeles: University of California Press, 2009. Print.
 Al-Jawaheri, Yasmin H. Women in Iraq. New York: Lynne Rienner Publishers, 2008. 37-51. Print.
 Fernea, Elizabeth W. Guests of the Sheik. Garden City, NY: Anchor Books, 1969. 12-13. Print.
 Harris, George L. Iraq: Its People, Its Society, Its Culture. New Haven, CT: Hraf Press, 1958. 11-17. Print.Iraq . Baltimore: The Lord Baltimore Press, 1946. 26-34. Print.
 Khan, Noor, and Heidi Vogt. Taliban Throws Acid on Schoolgirls Sweetness & Light, Nov. 2001. Web. 20 Jan. 2010.
 Raphaeli, Nimrod. Culture in Iraq Middle East Forum, July 2007. Web. 13 Jan. 2010.
 Stone, Peter G., and Joanne F. Bajjaly, eds. The Destruction of Cultural Heritage in Iraq. Rochester, NY: The Boydell Press, 2008. 24-40. Print.

External links 

 Official website of OWFI (archived)
 Solidarité Irak
 Fighting for women's rights in Iraq, interview with Yanar Mohammed on the subject of the murder of Dua Khalil Aswad, June 26, 2007, on the news Website CNN (warning: graphic images)
 A day in the life of Iraqi women, interview in two parts with Houzan Mahmoud on the condition of women in Iraq, Al Jazeera, March 3, 2007.

 
Iraq